is a Japanese footballer who plays as a midfielder for  club Montedio Yamagata.

Playing career
Kawai was born in Yamaguchi Prefecture on August 12, 1999. He joined J1 League club Sanfrecce Hiroshima from youth team in 2018.

On 12 December 2021, Kawai announcement officially transfer to J2 club, Montedio Yamagata for 2022 season.

Career statistics

Club

Updated to the start of 2023 season.

References

External links

1999 births
Living people
People from Iwakuni, Yamaguchi
Association football people from Yamaguchi Prefecture
Japanese footballers
J1 League players
J2 League players
Sanfrecce Hiroshima players
Renofa Yamaguchi FC players
Montedio Yamagata players
Association football midfielders